Acyloin condensation is a reductive coupling of two carboxylic esters using metallic sodium to yield an α-hydroxyketone, also known as an acyloin.

The reaction is most successful when R is aliphatic and saturated. The reaction is performed in aprotic solvents with a high boiling point, such as benzene and toluene in an oxygen free atmosphere of nitrogen (as even traces of oxygen interfere with the reaction path and reduce the yield). The use of protic solvents results in the Bouveault-Blanc reduction of the separate esters rather than condensation.  Depending on ring size and steric properties, but independent from high dilution, the acyloin condensation of diesters favours intramolecular cyclisation over intermolecular polymerisation when diesters are used (see below). To account for such cyclisation, it is suggested that the ends, where ester groups are present, are adsorbed, albeit weakly, at nearby sites on the sodium metal. Thus, the reactive ends are not available for polymerisation, thereby decreasing competition for the cyclisation process. Diesters possessing 10 or more carbons undergo cyclisation very easily.

Acyloin cyclization of diesters 

The cyclization of diesters by intramolecular acyloin condensation is a classical approach for the synthesis of aliphatic ring systems.  In general, compared to other cyclization reactions that proceed under basic conditions like the Ziegler-Thorpe and Dieckmann ring formation methods, the acyloin synthesis is suitable for more ring sizes, especially when the Rühlmann method is used to trap the cyclization product as the bis(trimethylsiloxy)alkene (enediol disilyl ether).  Although 3-membered rings are not accessible through the acyloin condensation, 5- and 6-membered rings form in high yield (80 – 85% yield), 4-, 7-, 10-, and 11-membered rings form in moderate yield (50 – 60% yield), 8- and 9-membered rings form in poor to modest yield (30 – 40% yield), and finally, 12-membered and higher rings form in good to excellent yields (>70% yield).  Although yields for 4-membered and medium-sized rings are poor to moderate, the acyloin condensation constitutes one of the earliest practical cyclization reactions to prepare these challenging ring sizes.  Tropolone is prepared via an initial acyloin condensation that delivers 2-hydroxycycloheptanone. 

In comparison, the Dieckmann method is practical only for 5- to 8-membered rings (with modest yields for 7- and 8-membered).  The Thorpe method is more easily modified via high dilution (e.g., 0.001 M in benzene/ether) to enable the synthesis of large rings, but 4-membered and 9- to 13-membered rings are still not accessible. Concentration is much less important a factor for obtaining high yields for the acyloin condensation, as the reaction occurs on the surface of the sodium metal.  Although, the need for sodium metal limits the functional group tolerance of the reaction, compared to more modern cyclization reactions (e.g. Yamaguchi esterification, ring-closing olefin metathesis), the acyloin condensation continues to be used in the synthesis of complex natural products for the preparation of challenging ring systems.

Mechanism

The mechanism consists of four steps:

(1) Oxidative ionization of two sodium atoms on the double bond of two ester molecules.
(2) Free radical coupling between two molecules of the homolytic ester derivative (A Wurtz type coupling). Alkoxy-eliminations in both sides occur, producing a 1,2-diketone.
(3) Oxidative ionization of two sodium atoms on both diketone double bonds. The sodium enodiolate is formed.
(4) Neutralization with water to form the enodiol, which tautomerizes to acyloin.

Variations

Rühlmann-method
The method according to Rühlmann employs trimethylchlorosilane as a trapping reagent; by this, competing reactions are efficiently subdued. Generally, yields increase considerably. The hydrolytic cleavage of the silylether gives the acyloin. To achieve a mild cleavage methanol can be used in several cases.

Usually toluene, dioxane, tetrahydrofuran or acyclic dialkylethers are employed as solvents. Advantageously also N-methyl-morpholine has been used. It allowed in some cases a successful reaction, in which otherwise the reaction failed in less polar media.

See also
Benzoin condensation
Bouveault–Blanc reduction
Claisen condensation
Dieckmann condensation

References

External links 
 An animation of the mechanism

Condensation reactions
Organic redox reactions
Carbon-carbon bond forming reactions